The Botswana–Namibia border is a  long border between Botswana and Namibia.

Border crossings 
Border crossings:

Namibia 

 Buitepos
 Shakawe
 Ngoma
 Impalila

Other

Zambia 

 Kazungula

Sedudu island dispute 

In 1992, the uninhabited Sedudu island sparked a border dispute between Botswana and Namibia. The island is located in the Cuando River, which is considered a part of the border between two countries. Judges at the World Court ruled that the island belonged to Botswana in December 1999.

References